"So Far Away" is a song by Dutch music producer Martin Garrix and  French music producer David Guetta, featuring guest vocals from  British singer Jamie Scott and Dutch singer Romy Dya. Released on 1 December 2017 via Stmpd Rcrds, it was written by Scott, Poo Bear, Garrix, Guetta and Giorgio Tuinfort, with production handled by the latter three. The song serves as a bonus track from Guetta's seventh studio album 7. The song was premiered during Garrix's performance at Tomorrowland 2017.

Background
On 30 July 2017, Garrix invited Guetta on stage to perform the song for the first time, during his mainstage appearance at Tomorrowland 2017. This original version featured female vocals provided by English singer Ellie Goulding. On 21 August, Garrix brought Guetta on stage to play the song once again, during a performance in Ibiza. A short footage captured by someone in the booth surfaced on Instagram. Prior to the performance, Garrix spoke to Capital about the song, calling it a "radio-friendly song" that will be released soon. Garrix posted short studio teasers of the song via Instagram Stories on 19 November, suggesting that it would be released soon.

On 22 November, Garrix revealed that Goulding was no longer featured on the song, when replying to an Ellie Goulding fan account on Twitter, who commented on Garrix's teasers. Goulding admitted in a series of tweets that her management and label were displeased because Garrix played the song at Tomorrowland before she had even heard the final product, leading to her vocals being cut from the track, but she emphasized that she was not behind the decision. She wrote that Garrix's statement "she didn't want to release it" is "completely untrue and unfair".

Garrix confirmed on 26 November that "So Far Away" and the Area21 track "Glad You Came" would be released on the same day, when replying to a fan who tweeted him asking which one comes out first. On 29 November, Garrix released an official teaser on social media, revealing the song's release date and featured artists, Jamie Scott and Romy Dya, the latter of which sang on the demo version of the track.

Critical reception
Kat Bein of Billboard called the song "a beautiful, future-pop ballad". He praised Dya for providing a "vulnerable and powerful" performance. Matthew Meadow of Your EDM also wrote that Dya did a "phenomenal job" with Scott, giving listeners goosebumps. He criticized the drop for its lack of originality, calling it "Scared to Be Lonely v2". Erik of EDM Sauce gave a similar review, writing: "The song will most likely not see the same level of success without Ellie Goulding as it is nothing absolutely outstandingly original." He also wrote that the song "has heaps of mainstream appeal" and "is exactly what the radio audiences in America currently look for in a release".

Music video
The accompanying music video was directed and produced by Damian Karsznia. The storyline features a young couple who were once in love and are currently struggling with the end of their relationship.

As of May 2021, the video has received over 233 million views.

Track listing

Credits and personnel
Credits adapted from Tidal.
 Martin Garrix – songwriting, production, mixing engineering
 David Guetta – songwriting, production
 Jamie Scott – songwriting, vocal production
 Giorgio Tuinfort – songwriting, production, engineering
 Poo Bear – songwriting
 Martin Hannah – engineering
 Rutger Kroese – engineering
 Jonny Coffer – vocal production

Charts

Weekly charts

Year-end charts

Certifications

References

2017 singles
2017 songs
David Guetta songs
Martin Garrix songs
Song recordings produced by David Guetta
Songs written by David Guetta
Songs written by Giorgio Tuinfort
Songs written by Jamie Scott
Songs written by Martin Garrix
Songs written by Poo Bear
Stmpd Rcrds singles